During the 1998–99 English football season, Portsmouth F.C. competed in the Football League First Division.

Season summary
Portsmouth's centenary season, 1998–99, saw a serious financial crisis hit the club and in December 1998, chairman Martin Gregory quit his post after being targeted of abuse from Portsmouth fans which gave him no choice but to sell his 97% ownership of the club and in February 1999, Portsmouth went into receivership. They avoided relegation again that season, and were then saved from closure by new chairman Milan Mandarić, who saved the club with a takeover deal in May 1999. The new chairman immediately started investing.

Final league table

Results
Portsmouth's score comes first

Legend

Football League First Division

FA Cup

League Cup

Squad
Squad at end of season

References

Portsmouth F.C. seasons
Portsmouth